Erica Adams "Rickey" Skinger (born March 21, 1949) is a former World Cup alpine ski racer from the United States.

Early years
Born in Burlington, Vermont, she was one of three daughters of Joseph and Constance Adams Skinger. The family moved from Alburg Springs on Lake Champlain to Stowe in 1957, where Skinger learned to ski and race on Mount Mansfield at the Stowe ski area. Her father Joe was a sculptor and jeweler and the family also operated a ski inn, the Tucker House Lodge on Mountain Road.

U.S. Ski Team
While in her late teens, Skinger was a member of the U.S. Ski Team. She was one of three teenagers (with Kiki Cutter and Judy Nagel) that arrived in Europe a month before the 1968 Winter Olympics to gain experience and also challenge for spots on the U.S. Olympic team. Allowed four entrants for each of the three Olympic alpine events, the U.S. team was traditionally selected at the previous year's national championships in March, but head coach Bob Beattie was dissatisfied with the women's team's performance in late 1967. Skinger did not make the U.S. Olympic team (Cutter and Nagel did) but had eight top ten finishes in World Cup competition, four in downhill and four in slalom in just over a year, from January 1968 to January 1969.

World Cup results
 8 top tens – (4 DH, 4 SL)

References

External links
 
 Erica Skinger World Cup standings at the International Ski Federation
 

1949 births
Living people
American female alpine skiers
Sportspeople from Burlington, Vermont
21st-century American women